Rip Esselstyn (born 1963), a former firefighter and triathlete, is an American health activist and food writer. He is the author of The Engine 2 Diet (2009), Plant-Strong (2016) previously published as My Beef With Meat (2013), and The Engine 2 Seven-Day Rescue Diet (2017).

Esselstyn is known as an advocate of a whole food, plant-based diet, one that omits meat, fish, eggs, dairy and processed foods. He calls it a "plant strong" diet, a term he has trademarked. He appeared in the 2011 documentary about plant-based nutrition, Forks Over Knives, as well as the 2018 documentary The Game Changers.

Background and early career
Esselstyn was born in Upstate New York, named after Rip Van Winkle, and grew up in Cleveland, Ohio. He is the great-grandson of George Washington Crile and the grandson of George Crile, Jr. His father, surgeon Caldwell Esselstyn, is one of the early promoters of a whole foods, plant-based diet in the prevention and reversal of heart disease.

Esselstyn attended the University of Texas at Austin on a swimming scholarship from 1982 to 1986. During that time he was an All-American swimmer. After college, he became a triathlete and competed for approximately ten years. In 1997, he retired as a triathlete and turned his attention towards becoming a firefighter and emergency medical technician, joining Engine 2 of the Austin Fire Department. Esselstyn eventually retired from firefighting to focus on becoming an advocate for plant-based nutrition.

Writing
While he grew up eating the standard American diet, Esselstyn switched to a whole-foods plant-based diet in 1987, cutting out meat, fish, eggs and dairy. He was also inspired by Dave Scott, who was a vegetarian.<ref>Black, Rosemary. Texas firefighter Rip Esselstyn aims to save lives - through his new diet book. Daily News (New York), February 25, 2009.</ref> Esselstyn describes his approach as "plant-strong" and has trademarked the term. He says he avoids the word "vegan" in case it discourages people, and believes that "plant strong" sounds healthier and more inclusive.

The Engine 2 Diet (2009)
In 2003, when a co-worker at the Engine 2 fire department discovered that his cholesterol was very high, Esselstyn encouraged the Engine 2 team to switch to a whole foods, plant-based diet to help their colleague. This experience eventually led him to write The Engine 2 Diet, which begins with a foreword by T. Colin Campbell, author of The China Study (2005).Going Cold Turkey From Meat, CBS, April 26, 2009.  The Engine 2 Diet appeared on The New York Times Best Seller ListThe New York Times Best Seller List, May 17, 2009 and was endorsed by Chicago Mayor Rahm Emanuel, who made a public appearance with Esselstyn in January 2013. In 2010, Whole Foods Market included The Engine 2 Diet as a "Healthy Eating Partner".

My Beef With Meat (2013)
In 2013, Esselstyn released another book, My Beef With Meat."Vegan firefighter on his 'Beef With Meat'." CBS This Morning, May 14, 2013. It was a New York Times best seller ("Advice, How-To, & Miscellaneous List") that reached the #1 spot for the week of June 2, 2013.

Forks Over Knives (2011)
Esselstyn appeared, along with his father and T. Colin Campbell, in the 2011 American documentary on whole foods, plant-based eating, Forks Over Knives. He later developed and starred in the follow-up documentary,  Forks Over Knives Presents: The Engine 2 Kitchen Rescue with Rip Esselstyn.Forks Over Knives Presents: The Engine 2 Kitchen Rescue: Official Site

Awards
2001 World Police and Fire Games: First Place
Capital of Texas triathlon: Eight-time winner
Escape from Alcatraz (triathlon): Six-time winner
U.S. Masters Swimming 200 Meter Backstroke record for men 55-59, set 7/20/2019

Works
Books

 Foreword by T. Colin Campbell.
Esselstyn, Rip (2016-12). The Engine 2 Seven-Day Rescue Diet. Hachette Book Group USA. . With recipes by Jane Esselstyn.

DVDForks Over Knives Presents The Engine 2 Kitchen Rescue with Rip Esselstyn'' (2011)

See also
Veganism
Vegan nutrition

References

External links
Official website of the Plantstrong diet

1963 births
Living people
American health activists
American male triathletes
American food writers
American health and wellness writers
American veganism activists
Sportspeople from Texas
University of Texas at Austin alumni
Vegan cookbook writers
People from New York (state)
Plant-based diet advocates